Marduk-aḫḫē-erība, inscribed in cuneiform contemporarily as mdAMAR.UTU-ŠEŠ-MEŠ-SU, meaning: “Marduk has replaced the brothers for me,” a designation given to younger sons whose older siblings have typically predeceased them, ruled  1042 BC as the 9th king of the 2nd Dynasty of Isin and the 4th Dynasty of Babylon, but only for around 6 months using the date formula: MU 1 ITI 6, which first appears in Kassite times and is open to interpretation. According to the Synchronistic Kinglist he was a contemporary of the Assyrian king Aššur-bêl-kala where only the beginning of his name appears below that of his immediate predecessor Adad-apla-iddina.

Biography

The only contemporary source is a kudurru (line art pictured), or gray limestone boundary marker, in a private collection in Istanbul, which records a land grant to a certain Kudurrâ, a “Ḫabiru” and servant of the king, in a region of northern Babylonia called Bīt-Piri’-Amurru. The term Ḫabiru may be a socio-economic designation rather than an indication of "Hebrew" ethnicity, since the name Kudurrâ is possibly not linguistically of semitic derivation. The field was surveyed by a diviner, a scribe named Nabû-ēriš the son of (i.e. descendant of) Arad-Ea, an administrator and a mayor.

It has been suggested that he is the 5th king represented in the Prophecy A by the single line, “A prince will arise, and his days will be short. He will not rule in the land.” This is a late Assyrian tablet found at Assur and first published in 1923, which narrates a sequence of 12 Babylonian kings.

See also
 Habiru

Inscriptions

Notes

References

11th-century BC Babylonian kings